Joseph Gaudérique Aymerich (20 February 1858 – 11 June 1937) was a French military officer in its colonial empire.

Biography
Aymerich was born in Estagel, in the Pyrénées-Orientales, the eldest of three sons of Férréol-Vincent Aymerich and Thérèse Marie Moner. He was commissioned at age 18, and attended the military college of Saint-Cyr. 
He commanded several units during World War I. 

He was military commander and Administrator of French Cameroons after the German colony of Kamerun was seized in the Kamerun campaign of World War I. In 1933, he published La Conquête du Cameroun (The Conquest of Cameroon).

References 

 E.H. Gorges (1930) The Great War in West Africa, Hutchinson & Co. Ltd., Londres; Naval & Military Press, Uckfield, 2004: 
 Jean-Paul Messina and Jaap van Slageren Histoire du christianisme au Cameroun: des origines à nos jours Pais-Yaoundé: Éditions Karthala-éditions Clé, 2005 
 Ibrahim Mouich Genre et commandement territorial au Cameroun, Cahiers d'études africaines 186 (2007)

External links 
 Biography and Photographs 

Grand Officiers of the Légion d'honneur
French generals
French military personnel
French military officers
People from Pyrénées-Orientales
1858 births
1937 deaths
École Spéciale Militaire de Saint-Cyr alumni
French military personnel of World War I
People of French West Africa
Colonial Governors of French Niger
French colonial governors and administrators